In molecular biology, fibrous proteins or scleroproteins are one of the three main classifications of protein structure (alongside globular and membrane proteins). Fibrous proteins are made up of elongated or fibrous polypeptide chains which form filamentous and sheet-like structures. These kind of protein can be distinguished from globular protein by its low solubility in water.  Such proteins serve protective and structural roles by forming connective tissue, tendons, bone matrices, and muscle fiber.

Fibrous proteins consist of many superfamilies including keratin, collagen, elastin, and fibrin. Collagen is the most abundant of these proteins which exists in vertebrate connective tissue including tendon, cartilage, and bone.

Biomolecular structure
A fibrous protein forms long protein filaments, which are shaped like rods or wires. Fibrous proteins are structural or storage proteins that are typically inert and water-insoluble. A fibrous protein occurs as an aggregate due to hydrophobic side chains that protrude from the molecule.

A fibrous protein's peptide sequence often has limited residues with repeats; these can form unusual secondary structures, such as a collagen helix. The structures often feature cross-links between chains (e.g., cys-cys disulfide bonds between keratin chains).

Fibrous proteins tend not to denature as easily as globular proteins.

Miroshnikov et al. (1998) are among the researchers who have attempted to synthesize fibrous proteins.

References

External links
 

Molecular biology
Proteomics
Structural proteins